Rebecca R. Freyre (born December 9, 1959) is a Judge of the Colorado Court of Appeals.

Early life and education

Freyre was born December 9, 1959 in Kansas City, Kansas. She earned her undergraduate degree at Smith College in 1982 and her Juris Doctor from the University of Denver College of Law in 1990.

Legal career

Before joining the court, she practiced as a criminal appellate lawyer for the Colorado State Public Defender's Office for eleven years and as a criminal trial deputy in the 18th Judicial District for fourteen years.

Appointment to state court of appeals

She was appointed by Governor John Hickenlooper on September 18, 2015, to succeed Judge Richard L. Gabriel. Her current term expires on January 7, 2019. Freyre must stand for retention by voters in 2018 in order to remain on the bench for a full eight-year term. She was sworn in on November 16, 2015.

Other activities
Freyre is married with three children.

References

External links
Biography on Colorado Judicial Branch website

Living people
1959 births
20th-century American lawyers
21st-century American judges
21st-century American lawyers
Colorado Court of Appeals judges
People from Kansas City, Kansas
Public defenders
Smith College alumni
University of Denver alumni
20th-century American women lawyers
21st-century American women lawyers
21st-century American women judges